Galyna Mykhailiuk (born 14 June 1987) is a Ukrainian lawyer and politician currently serving as a People's Deputy of Ukraine as the 46th member of the party list of Servant of the People. As Member of Parliament, she holds a position of the Deputy Head of the Committee on Law Enforcement and Co-Head of the Verkhovna Rada of Ukraine Groups on Interparliamentary Relations with Japan and Australia.

Previously, she served as a legislation drafting expert for European Union Advisory Mission Ukraine (EUAM Ukraine).

Early life and career 
From 2004 to 2009, Galyna Mykhailiuk studied at the Odesa Law Academy National University, graduating with a master's degree in law. She also graduated from the Odesa State Economic University in 2010 with a master's degree in economics and from the University of York in 2012 with a master's degree in international corporate and commercial law. In March 2019, the Ministry of Education of Ukraine approved the assignment of an associate's degree to Galyna Mykhailiuk.

Galyna Mykhailiuk previously served as a legislation drafting expert for European Union Advisory Mission Ukraine, managing the development and implementation of the EUAM projects “Enhancing the Legislative Drafting Capacities in the Area of Security Sector Reform of the Verkhovna Rada of Ukraine through EU Best Practices” and “Increasing the Role of the Verkhovna Rada of Ukraine in Promoting Better Regulation through Ex-post Impact Evaluation of Legislation”.

Political career 
Following the 2019 Ukrainian parliamentary election, Galyna Mykhailiuk was elected as a People's Deputy of Ukraine as a member of the party list of the Servant of the People party. At the time of her election, she was an independent. She is Deputy Head of the Verkhovna Rada Committee on Law Enforcement, Member of the Standing Delegation of the Verkhovna Rada of Ukraine in the NATO Parliamentary Assembly, Co-Head of the Groups for Interparliamentary Relations with Japan and Australia, Deputy Head of Groups for Interparliamentary Relations with the United States of America, the United Kingdom of Great Britain and Northern Ireland, the Kingdom of Norway, Canada, and the Republic of Singapore.

Academic publications 
Mykhailiuk has written over 90 academic publications. Her main publications are: 
 The EU Law on Commercial Designations. K., 2016; 2017;
 The Legal Analysis of Using Trade Marks as Keywords in Advertising through the Internet // Wissenschaftliches Sammelwerk der Ukrainischen Freien Universität. 2016. Bd. 21;
 Judicial Practice of the EU in IT: Some Categories of Cases // IT Law: Theory and Practice. O., 2017;
 Implementation of Constitutional Reform on Judiciary in Ukraine on its way towards European Integration // Journal of Contemporary European Research (Scopus). 2018. Vol. 14.
 Judicial Control over Arbitration in Ukraine. (Chapter 22), in Larry diMatteo, Marta Infantino, Nathalie Potin (eds.), The Cambridge Handbook of Judicial Control over Judicial Awards, Cambridge, CUP, 2021.P. 350 – 371.
 Larry Di Matteo, Galyna Mykhailiuk. Advancing the Rule of Law: Creating and Independent and Competent Judiciary. The Italian Law Journal (Scopus). Vol. 07 – No. 01, 2021. P. 61 – 95. (Scopus).
 Galyna Mykhailiuk, Larry DiMatteo. Creating a Comprehensive Peaceful Assembly Law for Ukraine: Idea and Ideal. New Perspectives: Interdisciplinary Journal of Central & East European Politics and International Relations (Scopus). Issue 29(1), 2021. P. 45 – 68.
 Mykhailiuk G., Rustamzade A., Bakhishov A. Digitalization of Financial Services and Challenges of Adaptation of Control. Financial and Credit Activities: Problems of Theory and Practice (Web of Science). №3(38), 2021. P. 46 – 55.

References 

1987 births
Living people
Politicians from Kyiv
Lawyers from Kyiv
Odesa Law Academy alumni
Odesa National Economics University alumni
Ukrainian women lawyers
21st-century Ukrainian lawyers
Ninth convocation members of the Verkhovna Rada
Servant of the People (political party) politicians
Academic staff of the National University of Kyiv-Mohyla Academy
21st-century Ukrainian politicians
21st-century Ukrainian women politicians
21st-century women lawyers
Women members of the Verkhovna Rada